The Anomaluridae are a family of rodents found in central Africa. They are known as anomalures or scaly-tailed squirrels. The six extant species are classified into two genera.

All anomalurids have membranes between their front and hind legs like those of a flying squirrel, but they are not closely related to the flying squirrels that form the tribe Petauristini of the family Sciuridae. They are distinguished by two rows of pointed, raised scales on the undersides of their tails. The anatomy of their heads is quite different from that of the sciurid flying squirrels.

By extending their limbs, anomalures transform themselves into a gliding platform that they control by manipulating the membranes and tail.

Most anomalurid species roost during the day in hollow trees, with up to several dozen animals per tree. They give birth to litters up to three young, which are born already furred and active.

Anomalurids represent one of several independent evolutions of gliding ability in mammals, having evolved from climbing animals. The others include the true flying squirrels of Eurasia and North America, colugos or flying lemurs of Southeast Asia, and the marsupial gliding possums of Australia.

Taxonomy 

Taxonomy follows Fabre et al. 2018.

Family Anomaluridae
Genus Anomalurus
Beecroft's flying squirrel, Anomalurus beecrofti
Lord Derby's scaly-tailed flying squirrel, Anomalurus derbianus
Pel's flying squirrel, Anomalurus pelii
Dwarf scaly-tailed squirrel, Anomalurus pusillus
Genus Idiurus
Long-eared flying mouse, Idiurus macrotis
Pygmy scaly-tailed flying squirrel, Idiurus zenkeri

Fossil genera 
Several fossil genera are also known:

 Genus †Argouburus
 Genus †Kabirmys
 Genus †Oromys
 Genus †Paranomalurus
 Genus †Pondaungimys
 Genus †Prozenkerella
 Genus †Shazurus

External websites 

Meet the Scaly-tail Gliders Among the weirdest and most fascinating of rodents are the scalytails/scaly-tails, scaly-tailed squirrels or anomalures, properly termed Anomaluridae.

References 

 
 
Extant Eocene first appearances
Taxa named by Paul Gervais